Wattinoma may refer to:

Burkina Faso places:
Wattinoma, Bam
Wattinoma, Bazèga
Wattinoma, Sourou